Eugene Lazowski born Eugeniusz Sławomir Łazowski (1913 in Częstochowa, Poland – December 16, 2006 in Eugene, Oregon, United States) was a Polish medical doctor who saved thousands of people during World War II by creating a fake epidemic which played on German phobias about hygiene. He also used his position as a doctor treating people travelling through a nearby train station to conceal his supply of medicine to Jews in the local ghetto, which backed on to his home. By doing this, he risked the death penalty, which was applied to Poles who helped Jews in the Holocaust.

World War II
Before the onset of World War II Eugeniusz Łazowski obtained a medical degree at the Józef Piłsudski University in Warsaw, Poland. During World War II Łazowski served as a Polish Army Second Lieutenant on a Red Cross train, then as a military doctor of the Polish resistance Home Army. Following the German occupation of Poland Łazowski resided in Rozwadów with his wife and young daughter. Łazowski spent time in a prisoner-of-war camp prior to his arrival in the town, where he reunited with his family and began practicing medicine with his medical-school friend Dr Stanisław Matulewicz. Using a medical discovery by Matulewicz, that healthy people could be injected with a strain of Proteus that would make them test positive for typhus without experiencing the disease, Łazowski created a fake outbreak of epidemic typhus in and around the town of Rozwadów (now a district of Stalowa Wola), which the Germans then quarantined. This saved an estimated 8,000 people from being sent to German concentration camps during the Holocaust.

Later life
In 1958, Lazowski emigrated to the United States on a scholarship from the Rockefeller Foundation and in 1976 became professor of pediatrics at the University of Illinois at Chicago. He wrote a memoir entitled Prywatna wojna (My Private War) which was reprinted several times, as well as over a hundred scientific dissertations.

Lazowski retired from practice in the late 1980s. He died in 2006 in Eugene, Oregon, where he had been living with his daughter.

In popular culture 

In 2001, Ryan Bank began work on documentary about Lazowski entitled A Private War, filming Lazowski's visit to Poland and recorded testimonies of people whose families were saved by the fake epidemic. There is no evidence that the film was ever completed or released.

References

External links 

He duped Nazis, saved thousands.  Source: The Sun-Times Company
. Holocaustforgotten.com
2 doctors used typhus to save thousands in wartime
Paula Davenport, Media & Communication Resources, Southern Illinois University, Life Preserver

Polish military doctors
Polish emigrants to the United States
Polish people of World War II
1913 births
2006 deaths
Polish people who rescued Jews during the Holocaust
Polish humanitarians
20th-century Polish physicians
Polish pediatricians
People from Częstochowa
University of Warsaw alumni
University of Illinois Chicago faculty
American pediatricians